Sanchez Reservoir lies in far southcentral Colorado, west of the Sangre de Cristo Mountains in Costilla County. Its inflows include Ventero Creek and the Sanchez Canal, a diversion canal that takes water from Culebra Creek and two other creeks.

Dam
The reservoir's earthen dam was built in 1912. Because the dam leaks a lot and because of ongoing drought in the region, the reservoir never really reaches its full capacity.

Fishing
Colorado Parks and Wildlife manages fishing at the reservoir, which forms the Sanchez Reservoir State Wildlife Area. However, the Colorado Department of Public Health and Environment has issued a "Fish consumption advisory," warning of unsafe mercury levels in northern pike and walleye caught in the lake.

References

External links
Sanchez Reservoir State Wildlife Area map and information

Reservoirs in Colorado
Lakes of Costilla County, Colorado
1912 establishments in Colorado
Dams completed in 1912
Wildlife management areas of Colorado